The 1992 Texas Longhorns football team represented the University of Texas at Austin during the 1992 NCAA Division I-A football season. They were represented in the Southwest Conference. They played their home games at Texas Memorial Stadium in Austin, Texas. The team was led by head coach John Mackovic, in his first season.

Schedule

Personnel

Season summary

Oklahoma

References

Texas
Texas Longhorns football seasons
Texas Longhorns football